Dhimitër "Mit" Dimroçi (24 April 1935  - 7 August 2013) was an Albanian footballer who played most of his professional career as a forward for Besa Kavajë.

Club career
Dhimitër Dimroçi started his career with hometown club Besa in 1953 and went on to serve as team captain. Known for his powerful left foot, he led the team to a successful second-place finish during the 1958 season. Dimroçi played for two other teams, Partizani Tirana and Luftëtari i Ushtrisë, concluding his long career in 1967.
Along with Qemal Gavardari and Hasan Gërmani, they formed an unforgettable attacking trio, famous in Albania during the 1950s and early 1960s.

References

1935 births
2013 deaths
Footballers from Kavajë
Albanian footballers
Association football forwards
Besa Kavajë players
FK Partizani Tirana players